The Rapture of the Nerds is a 2012 novel by Cory Doctorow and Charles Stross. It was released on September 4, 2012 through Tor Books and as an ebook, DRM free, under the CC BY-NC-ND. The book can also be downloaded for free.

Synopsis
The novel is a fixup of two novellas, "Jury Duty" and "Appeals Court", along with a new third section, "Parole Board". The book, set in the late 21st century, takes a generally comic look at the technological singularity through the eyes of Huw, a technophobic member of a "Tech Jury Service" tasked with determining the value of various technological innovations and deciding whether to release them.

Reception

Critical reception for The Rapture of the Nerds was mixed to positive, with the book gaining a positive review from Quill & Quire. NPR and Kirkus Reviews both gave mixed reviews, with NPR stating that when the conclusion "finally comes, feels like a simulation of a satisfying conclusion rather than the real thing".

References

External links 
Official Book Page on Cory Doctorow's website
Online Version of the book

2012 British novels
Novels by Cory Doctorow
Creative Commons-licensed novels
Novels by Charles Stross
2012 science fiction novels
Tor Books books
Transhumanist books
Postcyberpunk novels